The SJ Class Ra (or Rapid) is an electric locomotive operated by Swedish State Railways. Ten units were built by ASEA, two in 1955 and eight in 1961. Ra was used on express trains until the 1990s.

History
During the 1940s SJ had a need for quicker locomotives for their express trains. In 1953 two bogie-locomotives were ordered from ASEA. Inspiration for the appearance came from North America, with round shapes and a bulldog nose. The two first units were successful and SJ ordered additional eight units from ASEA, delivered in 1961. Though never being used for more than 130 km/h, it was capable for 150 km/h, and served mainly on Stockholm - Göteborg and Stockholm - Oslo. They were mainly taken out of service in the late 1980s, though two remained in service until 1996. Most have been preserved, including at the Swedish Railway Museum and at Nässjö Railway Museum. In 2012, Ra 988 was sold by the Swedish Railway Museum in 2012 and was sold to Svensk Tågkraft and is still in service.

External links

 Järnväg.net on Ra 

Railway locomotives introduced in 1955
Ra
ASEA locomotives
Bo′Bo′ locomotives
15 kV AC locomotives
Standard gauge locomotives of Sweden